Margaret Collins-O'Driscoll (18 August 1876 – 17 June 1945) was an Irish Cumann na nGaedheal politician who served as a Teachta Dála (TD) for the Dublin North constituency from 1923 to 1933.

Early life
Margaret Mary Collins was born in Woodfield, Clonakilty, County Cork on 18 August 1876. The eldest of three daughters and five sons of Michael Collins, a farmer, and Mary Anne O'Brien. She was the eldest sister of the Irish revolutionary leader Michael Collins. She was educated at Baggot Street Training College and was a schoolteacher and school principal before entering politics. A primary-school teacher, for many years she was principal of Lisavaird girls' national school in Clonakilty, and also taught in Dublin.

Politics
She was the first female Cumann na nGaedheal TD. In 1926 she was elected a vice-president of the party, and was the only female member of the Dáil between September 1927 and February 1932.

She was first elected to Dáil Éireann as a Cumann na nGaedheal TD for the Dublin North constituency at the 1923 general election. Socially conversative, she voted in favour of the 1928 Censorship of Publications bill, which banned indecent literature and publications that referred to birth control; and she voted with the government in favour of the 1924 and 1927 juries bills, which restricted jury service for women.

She was re-elected at each subsequent election until she lost her seat at the 1933 general election.

Family
She married Patrick O'Driscoll on 8 September 1901 at Rosscarbery's Roman Catholic chapel in County Cork. The couple had 14 children: five sons and nine daughters.

Actress Dervla Kirwan is a great-granddaughter of the O'Driscolls.

References

1876 births
1945 deaths
Margaret
Cumann na nGaedheal TDs
Irish schoolteachers
Members of the 4th Dáil
Members of the 5th Dáil
Members of the 6th Dáil
Members of the 7th Dáil
Politicians from County Cork
20th-century women Teachtaí Dála
Women heads of schools in Ireland